is a 2014 Japanese jidaigeki action film directed by Keishi Ōtomo and based on the manga series Rurouni Kenshin. It serves as a direct sequel to Rurouni Kenshin: Kyoto Inferno (2014), taking place immediately after as Kenshin recovers following losing Kaoru at sea.

On June 21, 2016, Funimation announced that they acquired the rights to the Rurouni Kenshin live-action trilogy for US distribution. The film was released subtitled in US theaters in October 2016. A home video and video on demand release followed shortly after.

Two further installments in the film series were released in 2021; Rurouni Kenshin: The Final, a sequel to The Legend Ends, and  Rurouni Kenshin: The Beginning, a prequel to the entire series.

Plot
In a flashback, Hiko Seijūrō finds young Shinta digging graves for bandits and slavers killed in battle. Shinta explains that all people are only bodies after death. Hiko decides to take Shinta as his student and names him "Kenshin". Himura Kenshin wakes up at Master Hiko's home, and asks if his friend (Kaoru) was also washed up. He has been unconscious for three days, and Master Hiko tells him that his friend is most likely dead. Kenshin asks to learn the final Hiten Mitsurugi technique, "Amakakeru Ryu no Hirameki", in order to defeat Shishio Makoto and prevent his onslaught. Hiko agrees, and the two engage in a duel to start his training.

Shishio appears off the Tokyo coast in a large black iron-clad battleship, and demands that the home minister, Ito Hirobumi, visit him to discuss the situation. After inviting the ministers to join him for food, one of them loses his temper, and is killed by one of Shishio's men. The prime minister tries to restore order and decorum, but Shishio takes them prisoner when they try to leave - killing all the government men apart from the prime minister. Shishio demands that Battousai be brought to him, otherwise he will bring down the government by making public all the killings and murders that were undertaken by the current government. Saito Hajime also known as Fujita is still searching for Battousai, and is disgusted with the way the government is handling the matter by giving in to blackmail from Shishio.

Yahiko Myojin finds a poster demanding "Battousai" Kenshin be arrested, which he and Sagara realise suggests that Kenshin must still be alive, and they leave for Tokyo and the Kamiya Dojo with Misao to find him and search for Kaoru Kamiya. A young woman approaches them with a scarf as they are leaving, which Misao recognises as the one she bandaged Kaoru with and they rush off. They appear outside a hospital and enter to find Kaoru unconscious and alive.

Kenshin learns through his training from Hiko that he had thrown away his will to live during his time as the assassin Battōsai, and as he has no intention of coming out alive he will be unable to defeat Shishio. Hiko also points out that Kenshin has lost his killer instinct with his oath to not kill and his ridiculous" sword, after all it is the strong who survive and the weak who die. That night, Hiko says that something is missing in Kenshin, and that he will be given the night to think about it. If he cannot figure out what it is, he will die the next day. The next morning, Kenshin is still unable to understand what is missing in himself. So Hiko reveals his final task as Master to Kenshin - without realising what is missing, Kenshin will return to his old ways - and so Hiko has to kill Battōsai. When Hiko attacks him, Kenshin realises that he is trembling. It is not from fear of his master but from fear of death itself and instinctively uses his sword to protect himself as he does not want to die. Kenshin listens as he is told by his master that he cannot learn the secret until he realises that the will to live is paramount, that his life is just as worthy as others and so he has learned the secret of Amakakeru.

Kaoru awakes from her coma, and reunited with Yahiko and Sanosuke they return to Tokyo.  As Kenshin concludes his training and is about to depart, Makimachi Misao arrives with the news that Kaoru is alive. She also tells Kenshin that he has been branded a wanted criminal throughout Japan for his work as Battōsai during the Bakumatsu era. Knowing that Shishio intends to take Tokyo next, Kenshin intends to return home by a secret route given to him by the Oniwabanshu at the Aoiya Inn. They discover that  Kashiwazaki Nenji (also known as Okina) has gone on ahead and encountered Shinomori Aoshi, who was lying in wait for Kenshin on that route. Kenshin and Misao arrive and Kenshin duels with Aoshi, during which Okina dies of his wounds. Back at the Aoiya, Misao tends to Aoshi and convinces him to return to the Oniwabanshu. On Shishio's battleship, Shishio, his partner Yumi, and one of his men Hori, discover that because of Shishio's inability to sweat, he can only fight for fifteen minutes without putting his health at risk.

Kenshin arrives back at the Kamiya Kashin dojo.  Takani Megumi, who has been looking after the dojo in Kaoru's absence, welcomes him back, but shortly after his arrival police arrive to apprehend him. Wishing to prevent further violence, he surrenders, and is taken to the Home Ministry head, Ito Hirobumi. Ito explains that he had tried to talk Shishio into abandoning his plan to overthrow the Meiji government, but the negotiations had ended in disaster and Shishio, still bitter about his cruel treatment by the new government (being burned alive), would only leave the government be for the time being if Kenshin were arrested and executed. Otherwise, he intends to attack Tokyo. Kenshin convinces Ito that he can defeat Shishio if Ito helps him. Ito seemingly decides to go through with the execution anyway. Kaoru, Sano and Yahiko return to Tokyo soon after and, to their horror, discover that Kenshin is to be executed the same day. Shishio's men attend the execution to ensure that Ito carries through with the negotiations.

The execution, however, is merely staged, and Kenshin is freed and assisted in defeating the men by Hajime Saito. Sano joins them, and the three are rowed to Shishio's battleship. While searching for Shishio, Kenshin meets Seta Soujiro again and the two rematch. Kenshin comes out victorious, and Soujiro, who originally believed Kenshin to be weak, is crushed and confused. Kenshin finally finds Shishio, Yumi and Hori waiting in the ship's hold. A duel ensues between Kenshin and Shishio, who easily overpowers Kenshin. Saito arrives immediately after, followed by Sano and Aoshi, who followed them from Kyoto, but even the four together are no match for Shishio. Shishio hits his limit of 15 minutes and Yumi attempts to shield him from Kenshin while Shishio stabs both of them, killing her. Meanwhile, Ito's men begin firing at the ship, intending to sink it and drown both Shishio and Kenshin inside. Shishio condemns Kenshin for helping such a government. Kenshin agrees that the new Meiji government is faulty, but argues that the age of assassins like himself and Shishio is over and that there should be no more violence. He manages to defeat Shishio using Amakakeru, though not physically harming him. Shishio, who has long hit his limit and whose body has become overheated, catches fire and burns to death before the group's eyes.

Saito, Aoshi, Sano and Kenshin escape from the ship before it sinks and are brought back to shore, where Kaoru, Yahiko, Misao and the Home Ministry are waiting. Ito acknowledges Kenshin as Himura Kenshin for the first time while declaring Battōsai dead, and his men salute the group as heroes. Aoshi and Misao return to Kyoto, and Kaoru, Kenshin, Yahiko and Sano return to the dojo. Kaoru notes the change of season, as well as the end of Kenshin's life as Battōsai. Kenshin expresses his desire to continue living at the dojo and to move forward into the new era, and invites Kaoru to move forward with him.

Cast
Principal cast list as presented on the Funimation Films website in Western name order:

 Takeru Satoh as Kenshin Himura
 Emi Takei as Kaoru Kamiya
 Munetaka Aoki as Sanosuke Sagara
 Yū Aoi as Megumi Takani
 Kaito Oyagi as Yahiko Myojin
 Yusuke Iseya as Aoshi Shinomori
 Yōsuke Eguchi as Hajime Saito
 Tatsuya Fujiwara as Makoto Shishio
 Ryunosuke Kamiki as Sojiro Seta
 Maryjun Takahashi as Yumi Komagata
 Tao Tsuchiya as Misao Makimachi
 Min Tanaka as Okina
 Masaharu Fukuyama as Seijuro Hiko
 Yukiyoshi Ozawa as Ito Hirobumi

Production
Otomo said the final fight scene was the most difficult scene to shoot, mainly due to how Satoh and Fujiwara did not use stunts. Nevertheless, the director found it as an "epic" scene.

Release
The Blu-ray and DVD was released on January 21, 2015 in Japan.

The film was released on Blu-ray and DVD by Funimation on January 3, 2017 in North America which includes an English dubbed version of the film, with a TV-MA rating.

Reception

Box office 
The film debuted at the Japanese box office in second place, earning . In its fourth weekend, it ranked first and earned . It was number-one for four weeks. It was one of the top five films of 2014 at the Japanese box office (below Kyoto Inferno at number three), grossing  in Japan.

Critical reception 
The film received largely positive reviews from critics, once again receiving widespread recognition for its ground-breaking fight choreography and action direction coordinated by Kenji Tanigaki.

Gareth Evans, director of The Raid and The Raid 2, shared high praise for the live-action Rurouni Kenshin trilogy from director Keishi Ōtomo, Studio Swan and WB Japan. Through a series of Tweets and Instagram posts, Evans stated "Goddamn the action in Rurouni Kenshin is [frick]ing beautiful. Huge tip of the hat to choreographer Kenji Tanigaki" and went on to commend the third act of the film, specifically the final battle between Seta Sōjirō and Himura Kenshin. "Piled through the trilogy on a flight. Sojiro vs. Kenshin is poss one of the best sword fights I’ve seen. Must buy, must rewatch, must study!" as well as "Revisiting the Rurouni Kenshin films and f--k me this is such a beautifully complex shot. Pure action cinema, all about the rhythm and energy."

Roxy Simmons of Eastern Kicks described "The challenge with adapting any popular media is striking a balance that caters to fans of the source material but also allows the film to stand alone for the average viewer. This film does exactly that. The Legend Ends beautifully ties up the story begun in Kyoto Inferno, the second installment, delivering a fiery climax that melts into the sweetest of endings. — As an adaptation, the film is one that does deviate in places from its source material, though the approval of the manga artist, Nobuhiro Watsuki, is a clear indicator of how well these were done, and fans of the anime and manga will definitely be pleased with the near perfect execution of scenes that are practically lifted off the page. The acting has consistently been good in these Kenshin movies, and the cast delivered solid performances once again. Tatsuya Fujiwara, in particular, was finally able to spread his wings in this, and was fantastic as the antagonist Makoto Shishio, portraying a nuanced version of his character and vulnerabilities that made his end all the more satisfying."

Lito B. Zulueta of Philippine Daily Inquirer praised the film, declaring that "The Legend Ends" has "restored the samurai genre", and goes on to commend various aspects of the film. "Legend ends in a duel to the death of the two swordsmen. Needless to say, the fight is a spectacle to end all fight spectacles. Directed by Keishi Ohtomo, the Rurouni Kenshin movies are fabulous spectacles that deny itself the usual Hollywood gloss and over-the-top CDG tricks to achieve its epic look and proportion. It instead relies on good old classic filmmaking. The production design and art direction are first-rate. The two-part sequel, for instance, begins and ends in spring, and the production so evokes beautifully the season that viewers may be driven to tearful exaltation. The "Rurouni" movies are in the tradition of classic Japanese photography. Moreover, the production is driven by a gripping storyline and very compelling characters. For example, Kenshin and Shishio are totally engaging and, in their own terms of twisted motivation and mission, credible characters."

Derek Elley of Film Business Asia awarded the film an 8 out of 10, praising its "reflective lead-up to a humdinger finale." and commended the film's action direction "the mammoth duel on the villain's iron battleship, staged by action director Kenji Tanigaki in a way that shows a return to his Hong Kong training visible in the first movie in the series. Instead of the bloodless slash-and-bustle sword fights that dominated Kyoto, the finale is more mano a mano, contact fighting, in a virtual arena in the bowels of the battleship. There's also an intriguing hint that there's not that much difference between the villain and his opponents — all are basically dinosaurs from a now-outmoded warrior culture."

In a mixed review, Clarence Tsui of The Hollywood Reporter criticized the film's two hour length, as well as its expository first act, and choreography, labeling it "riveting" but the climax of the four against Shishio "po-faced absurdity." and goes on to comment "Characters talk in glib soundbites offering cod philosophy: Himura's mentor and friends harp on about the importance of self-respect, while Shishio — all bandaged up because of the burns he suffered at the hands of his erstwhile government employers — taunts his foes for their warped morals and failure to see that there's profit to be had in fearmongering." Tsui states later in the review that "The Legend Ends offers a type of wide-screen, cinematic entertainment that most Japanese film adaptations — of TV series or comics — now lack. The proper way forward — for its producers or its international distributors, is to combine (the more engaging) Kyoto Inferno and (the more socially conscious) The Legend Ends into one, so as to give Rurouni Kenshin — whether it's Watsuki's source material or Otomo's films — a compact, satisfactory finale."

Music
One Ok Rock's song "Heartache" from their album 35xxxv is featured in the film.

Accolades

Sequels

Plans for another sequel had been revealed by Daily.co.jp on September 4, 2017, in connection the main actress Emi Takei's breach of contract due to her marriage with Exile band member Takahiro, as well as her pregnancy. Takei had agreements with up to 10 companies for commercials, including JTB and Yōfuku no Aoyama, and it was reported that her agreement with SSP might be terminated, with her commercial agreements with other companies being affected. Oscar Promotion, Takei's agency, apologized to its clients, and was negotiating penalties for breach of contract. The penalty for her breach of contract could have reached up to 1 billion yen (about US$9.11 million). On April 12, 2019, it was announced that two new live-action films will premiere in summer 2020; Rurouni Kenshin: The Final was slated to premiere on July 3 and Rurouni Kenshin: The Beginning on August 7. Both films were delayed to 2021 due to COVID-19.

References

External links
 

2014 films
Funimation
Japanese sequel films
Live-action films based on manga
Rurouni Kenshin films
Samurai films
Warner Bros. films
Films directed by Keishi Ōtomo
2010s historical adventure films
Historical action films
Films set in the 19th century
Films set in the Meiji period
Films scored by Naoki Satō
Japanese historical adventure films
2010s Japanese films